Oleksandr Chervonyi (born 1 September 1961) is a Ukrainian professional football coach and a former player.

He played 4 games in the European Cup 1989–90 for FC Dnipro Dnipropetrovsk.

Honours
 Soviet Top League champion: 1983, 1988.
 Soviet Top League runner-up: 1989.
 Soviet Top League bronze: 1984.
 Soviet Cup winner: 1989.
 USSR Super Cup winner: 1989.
 USSR Federation Cup winner: 1989.
 USSR Federation Cup finalist: 1990.
 Ukrainian Premier League bronze: 1995.

External links
 Profile at allplayers.in.ua
 Profile at ffu.org.ua

1961 births
Living people
Sportspeople from Dnipropetrovsk Oblast
Soviet footballers
Soviet expatriate footballers
Expatriate footballers in Hungary
Soviet expatriate sportspeople in Hungary
Ukrainian footballers
FC Dnipro players
FC Elektrometalurh-NZF Nikopol players
FC Rotor Volgograd players
Nyíregyháza Spartacus FC players
NK Veres Rivne players
FC Zorya Luhansk players
Soviet Top League players
Ukrainian Premier League players
Ukrainian football managers
FC Mariupol managers
Association football defenders